The Battle of Old Crow is the second album by the American stoner/doom metal band Serpent Throne.

It was recorded, mixed, and mastered by Mick Mullin at Super 8 Studios, Harleysville, Pennsylvania.

Track listing

CD version
  "The Battle of Old Crow"   – 4:57
  "Speed Queen"   – 3:30
  "Rock Formation"   – 5:28
  "One Percenter"   – 3:39
  "Red Moon Harvest"   – 5:10
  "Snakecharmer"   – 6:06
  "Led by Vultures"   – 4:34
  "As the Serpent Descends"   – 3:51
  "White Buffalo"   – 4:52
  "Thirteen Mountains"   – 5:18

LP version
Side A
  "The Battle of Old Crow"   – 4:57
  "Speed Queen"   – 3:30
  "Rock Formation"   – 5:28
  "Red Moon Harvest"   – 5:10
  "As the Serpent Descends"   – 3:51

Side B
  "Snakecharmer"   – 6:06
  "Led by Vultures"   – 4:34
  "White Buffalo"   – 4:52
  "Thirteen Mountains"   – 5:18

References

2009 albums
Serpent Throne albums